Kislaya Guba (meaning sour bay in Russian) is a fjord on the Kola Peninsula near Murmansk, Russia. The fjord is connected to the Barents Sea to the north and is primarily known as the site of the experimental tidal power project, Kislaya Guba Tidal Power Station.

See also
List of fjords of Russia

References 

Bays of the Barents Sea
Fjords of Russia
Bodies of water of Murmansk Oblast

de:Kislaja Guba